Alien Love Triangle is a 2008 comedy-science fiction short film directed by Danny Boyle. It was filmed in 1999.

The film was originally intended to be one of a trilogy of 30-minute short films shown together. However, the two other films, Mimic and Impostor, were turned into full-length features, and the project was cancelled.

The film had its world premiere as part of the closing ceremony of the smallest theatre in the UK, La Charrette, on 23 February 2008, an event organised by Mark Kermode of The Culture Show. Kenneth Branagh attended the screening. The film's only other recorded screening was shortly after the premiere, at the Kenneth Branagh season at the National Media Museum, again with Branagh in attendance.

Premise

Steven Chesterman is a scientist who has created a teleportation device and hopes to use it for various purposes. He then goes home to his wife to share the news, but he learns she has a surprise for him: she is from outer space. It leads to a string of unusual events where beings from space come to visit Chesterman and his friends and show that all is not as things seem.

Cast 
Kenneth Branagh as Steven Chesterman
Alice Connor as Sarah
Courteney Cox as Alice
Heather Graham as Elizabeth

References

External links 
 
 

2008 films
2008 short films
British science fiction comedy films
2000s science fiction comedy films
British science fiction short films
Films shot at Elstree Film Studios
Films directed by Danny Boyle
Films scored by Simon Boswell
Films with screenplays by John Hodge
2008 comedy films
2000s English-language films
2000s British films